is a Japanese professional sumo wrestler. He began his professional career in 2012 at the age of eighteen and reached the top makuuchi division in September 2015. His highest rank to date has been sekiwake. He has four gold stars for defeating yokozuna, five special prizes for Outstanding Performance and one special prize for Technique. He wrestles for the Oitekaze stable. In January 2021 he became the first wrestler from Saitama Prefecture to win the top-division championship. He was  a runner-up in the May 2022 tournament.

Early life and education
Hayato Takanishi was born on 10 November 1993 in Asaka, a city in Saitama Prefecture. He started sumo after winning a local tournament during his first year in elementary school. At junior high he was a member of a sumo club in Iruma, where he first developed his thrusting attack. He attended , a school famous for its sumo club, and earned a place in the club's first team near the end of his second year. In his final year he contributed to the school finishing in second place in the team competition at national championships. After graduation he joined Oitekaze stable to pursue a professional sumo career. Coming from a single-parent family, he was keen to support his mother.

Career

Early career
Takanishi Hayato entered sumo under his birth name but adopted the ring name Daishoei for his first competitive tournament. He won the jonokuchi division with a 7–0 record in March 2012 and a 6–1 record in jonidan in May saw him promoted to sandanme where he recorded four wins in July. He then modified his ring name slightly and became Daieishō. After winning records in the next two tournaments he was promoted to makushita but struggled in higher division and was relegated back to sandanme. A perfect 7–0 in May 2013 saw him take the divisional championship and secure a return to makushita. After three consecutive winning records (kachi-koshi) Daieishō was promoted to the second highest jūryō division for the July 2014 tournament, the 14th former student of Saitama Sakae's coach Michinori Yamada to reach the rank. After performing consistently in jūryō for a year he earned promotion to the top division (makuuchi) with a 9–6 record in July 2015.

Makuuchi career
In September 2015 Daieishō made his makuuchi debut at the rank of maegashira 13. He was the youngest man in the division at 21 years old. He won seven of his first fourteen bouts, including an upset victory over Takarafuji but a final day defeat against Takekaze saw him end the tournament with a 7–8 losing record (make-koshi). In November he recorded only six wins and was demoted to jūryō but returned to the top division after an 8–7 record in January 2016. In March 2016 Daieishō produced a career-best effort, recording ten wins including victories over Ichinojō and Takekaze to place him in a tie for seventh place. In May, at career-high rank of maegashira 9 he stood at 6–4 after ten days but then slumped to five consecutive defeats. He struggled again in July, recording only five wins and dropped to maegashira 16 for September. His seven tournament run in the top division ended after a 5–10 record saw him relegated to jūryō for the November tournament but he responded with eight wins to put himself back in contention for promotion.

In January 2017 he won the jūryō division with a 12–3 record to secure his promotion back to makuuchi. He produced his best result in the top division to date in the March 2017 tournament, winning his last eight bouts in a row to finish on 11–4. This saw him promoted to his highest rank to date of maegashira 3 for the May tournament. Facing all the yokozuna and ōzeki for the first time, he followed his eight consecutive wins in March with eight losses in his first eight bouts in May and finished with a 4–11 record. After falling to maegashira 13 with a poor 5–10 score in November 2017, he recovered somewhat to post consecutive 9–6 records in the January and March tournaments of 2018.

He reached maegashira 2 in March 2019, and remained near the top of the maegashira ranks in the next few tournaments. In September he earned his first kinboshi with a  defeat of Kakuryū, his first win over a yokozuna in eleven attempts. He attained a career highest rank of maegashira 1 in the November 2019 tournament, and earned his career kinboshi on Day 2 with a first win over Hakuhō in five attempts. Hakuhō went on to win the tournament and as the only man to defeat him, Daieisho received the Outstanding Performance Prize. He made his debut at the komusubi rank in January 2020, narrowly failing to secure a majority of wins, finishing on 7–8. He returned to komusubi  in July 2020, where he defeated Hakuhō again, won his last six bouts to finish on 11–4 and won his second Outstanding Performance Prize. He was promoted to sekiwake for the September 2020 tournament, the first sekiwake from Saitama Prefecture since Wakachichibu in July 1963, but returned to the maegashira ranks after recording only five wins in the tournament.

Daieishō won his first Emperor's Cup in the January 2021 tournament with a 13-2 record at the rank of maegashira 1. He defeated all of the san'yaku wrestlers ranked above him in the first week, the first maegashira to so since 15 day tournaments began in 1949. He then lost to Takarafuji on day 9 and Onosho on day 11. He won his last four matches and clinched the title with a tsukidashi win over Okinoumi on the final day. He received both the Outstanding Performance Award and Technique Prize for his efforts. When interviewed he commented "My intention was always to push and drive the opponent out, which I could keep in my mind for the final bout. There were lots of bouts I could take confidence from too and I hope to keep wrestling the same way." He was the first wrestler from Saitama Prefecture to win the top-division championship. Although he was widely expected to return to his former sekiwake rank in the March 2021 tournament, he instead made his return to san'yaku at the rank of komusubi, and has affirmed his desire to accomplish promotion to ōzeki. He held the komusubi rank with an 8–7 record, but lost it after the May tournament and returned to the maegashira ranks. In September 2021 he earned his third career  by handing Terunofuji his first loss as a yokozuna on Day 9. 

He defeated Terunofuji again on Day 2 of the March 2022 tournament for his fourth . Returning to komusubi for the May 2022 tournament, he defeated Terunofuji on the opening day, and finished with eleven wins and a share of second place. He was awarded his fifth Outstanding Performance Prize. He was promoted to sekiwake for the July tournament, but finished with a losing 6–7–2 record, due to a COVID-19 infection that ruled him out of action for the last two days of the tournament. He finished with 7–8 records in the last two tournaments of 2022.

In January 2023 he was ranked maegashira 1. In the January tournament he achieved a 10–5 record, which included wins over upper ranked wrestlers Hōshōryū, Wakatakakage and Shōdai. In February Daieishō won the 47th Fuji TV Grand Sumo Tournament defeating Hōshōryū in the final. In the March he was promoted back to the rank of komusubi.

Fighting style
Daieishō is a tsuki and oshi specialist, which means he relies on thrusting and pushing techniques to defeat his opponents rather than belt-wrestling. By far the most common of his winning techniques is oshidashi which accounts for 55% of his wins. Although he also used belt gripping techniques during his high school career, he has focused on pushing and thrusting since turning professional. In an interview upon the announcement of his promotion to Juryo in May 2014, Daieishō was quoted as saying he wanted to thrust like former ōzeki Chiyotaikai.

Career record

See also
Glossary of sumo terms
List of active sumo wrestlers
List of sumo tournament top division champions
List of sumo tournament top division runners-up
List of sumo tournament second division champions
List of active gold star earners
List of sekiwake
Active special prize winners

References

External links

1993 births
Living people
Japanese sumo wrestlers
Sumo people from Saitama Prefecture
Sekiwake